Swift Creek is an unincorporated community in DeKalb County, Georgia, in the United States. It is located north of Lithonia and south of Stone Mountain.

References

Unincorporated communities in Georgia (U.S. state)